Albert II  (Albert Alexandre Louis Pierre Grimaldi; ; born 14 March 1958) is Prince of Monaco, reigning since 2005.

Albert was born at the Prince's Palace of Monaco, and he is the second child and only son of Prince Rainier III and Grace Kelly. He attended the Lycée Albert Premier before studying political science at Amherst College. In his youth, he competed in bobsleigh during Winter Olympic finals before retiring in 2002. Albert was appointed regent in March 2005 after his father fell ill, and became sovereign prince upon his death a week later. Since his ascension, he has been outspoken in the field of environmentalism  and an advocate of ocean conservation, and adoption of renewable energy sources to tackle global climate change, and founded The Prince Albert II of Monaco Foundation in 2006, to directly raise funds and initiate action for such causes and greater ecological preservation.

With assets valued at more than $1 billion, Albert owns shares in the Société des Bains de Mer, which operates Monaco's casino and other entertainment properties in the principality.

In July 2011, Prince Albert married South African Olympic swimmer Charlene Wittstock. He has four children, American-born Jazmin Grace Grimaldi, French-born Alexandre Grimaldi-Coste and the twins Princess Gabriella and Hereditary Prince Jacques.

Early life and military service

Prince Albert was born in the Prince's Palace of Monaco on 14 March 1958, as the second child of the Prince and Princess of Monaco. At the time of his birth, he was heir apparent to the throne. He has Irish, German, and Monegasque ancestry. The Prince was a dual citizen of both the Principality of Monaco and the United States of America by birth, before renouncing his American citizenship in his early adulthood. He was baptized on 20 April 1958, by Monsignor Jean Delay, Archbishop of Marseille, in the Cathedral of the Immaculate Conception of Monaco. His godparents were Prince Louis de Polignac and Queen Victoria Eugenie of Spain.

Albert graduated with distinction from the Lycée Albert Premier, in 1976. He was a camper, and later a counselor for six summers at Camp Tecumseh, on Lake Winnipesaukee, Moultonborough, New Hampshire, in the 1970s. He spent a year training in princely duties before enrolling at Amherst College, in Massachusetts, in 1977 as Albert Grimaldi. He later joined Chi Psi fraternity. Albert spent mid-1979 touring Europe and the Middle East with the Amherst College Glee Club, and also undertook an exchange program with the University of Bristol, at the Alfred Marshall School of Economics and Management, in 1979. He graduated in 1981 with a Bachelor of Arts degree in political science. He speaks French, German, Italian, and American English.  From September 1981 to April 1982, Albert trained on board the French Navy's helicopter carrier Jeanne d'Arc, attaining the rank of Ship-of-the-Line Ensign (2nd class), and is currently a reserve Lieutenant Commander. From 1983 to 1985, he took training courses with companies J.P. Morgan & Co, LVMH, Rogers & Wells, and Wells, Rich and Greene in the United States and Europe, studying financial management, communication, and marketing. Since May 1993, the Prince has led the Monegasque delegation to the General Assembly of the United Nations. In 2004, the Prince presided over the delegation of Monaco in Strasbourg, France, for the official accession of the Principality onto the Council of Europe.

Prince Albert's mother, Princess Grace died at age 52 as a result of injuries sustained in a car accident in 1982. In 2017, the Prince stated during an interview that his mother's death was a traumatic event for him and his family, revealing that his father was "never the same man" after the loss.

Sports career

Albert was an enthusiastic sportsman, participating in cross country, javelin throwing, handball, judo, swimming, tennis, rowing, sailing, skiing, squash and fencing.  He became a judo black belt in 1985.

Albert competed in the bobsleigh at five consecutive Winter Olympics for Monaco, taking part in both the two-man and four-man events. In the two-man bobsleigh Albert finished 25th at the 1988 games in Calgary, 43rd at the 1992 games in Albertville, and 31st at the 1994 games. In the four-man bobsleigh Albert finished 27th in 1992, 26th at the 1994 games in Lillehammer, and 28th at both the 1998 games in Nagano and the 2002 games in Salt Lake City. Albert was Monaco's flag bearer at the 1988, 1994, and 1998 Winter Olympics. He also took part in the 1985 Paris–Dakar Rally, but did not complete it. Albert has been a member of the International Olympic Committee since 1985, and his maternal grandfather, John B. Kelly Sr., and maternal uncle, John B. Kelly Jr., were both Olympic medalists in rowing. In 2017 Albert gained OLY post-nominal status under his competition name of Albert Grimaldi.

Accession
On 31 March 2005, following consultation with the Crown Council of Monaco, the Palais Princier announced that Albert would take over the duties of his father as regent since Rainier was no longer able to exercise his princely functions. On 6 April 2005, Rainier died and Albert succeeded him as Albert II.

The first part of Prince Albert II's enthronement as ruler of the Principality was on 12 July 2005, after the end of the three-month mourning period for his father. A morning Mass at Saint Nicholas Cathedral presided over by the Archbishop of Monaco, the Most Reverend Bernard Barsi, formally marked the beginning of his reign. Afterward, Albert returned to the Palace to host a garden party for 7,000 Monégasques born in the principality. In the courtyard, the Prince was presented with two keys of the city as a symbol of his investiture, and subsequently gave a speech. The evening ended with a fireworks display on the waterfront.

The second part of his investiture took place on 19 November 2005. Albert was enthroned at Saint Nicholas Cathedral. The Princely family was in attendance, including his elder sister, Princess Caroline with her husband Ernst, Prince of Hanover and three of her four children, Andrea, Pierre and Charlotte; as well as his younger sister Princess Stéphanie, his paternal aunt Princess Antoinette, Baroness of Massy, his godson, Jean-Léonard Taubert-Natta de Massy, and his cousin Elisabeth-Anne de Massy. Royalty from 16 delegations were present for the festivities throughout the country. The evening ended with a dedicated performance at the Opéra de Monte-Carlo.

Reign

In the early years of his reign, Prince Albert oversaw multiple judicial and legal reforms, including the regulation of custody, protections of the privacy of the individual in the face of technological growth, freedom of the press, legislative gender equality, and the protection of children's rights and disabled students. In July 2005, in echo of Albert I, his great-great-grandfather, he travelled to Spitsbergen, Norway. During this trip, he visited the glaciers Lilliehöökbreen and Monacobreen. Prince Albert also engaged in a Russian Arctic expedition, reaching the North Pole on Easter, 16 April 2006. He is the first incumbent head of state to have reached the North Pole.

Since his ascension, the Prince has overseen the construction of various community facilities, including social housing, railway infrastructure, educational institutes for the hospitality industry, and secondary education. He currently heads an initiative to promote ethical economic activity, criminal liability, the adopting of systems to combat money laundering and organized crime, and the introduction of tax fraud into Monegasque criminal law. In 2006, Prince Albert created the Prince Albert II of Monaco Foundation, which continues Monaco's commitment to supporting sustainable and ethical projects around the world. The foundation's focus has three main objectives: climate change and renewable energy development, combating the loss of biodiversity, and improving universal access to clean water.

On 27 August 2015, Prince Albert apologized for Monaco's role in facilitating the deportation of a total of 90 Jews and resistance fighters to the Nazis in 1942, of whom only nine survived. "We committed the irreparable in handing over to the neighboring authorities women, men, and a child who had taken refuge with us to escape the persecutions they had suffered in France," Albert said at a ceremony in which a monument to the victims was unveiled at the Monaco Cemetery. "In distress, they came specifically to take shelter with us, thinking they would find neutrality."

Between 2006 and 2022, his chief of cabinet was Georges Lisimachio.

Personal life

In 2016, Albert purchased Princess Grace's childhood home in East Falls, Philadelphia, which was originally built by her grandfather Jack Kelly. Upon acquiring it, he stated the house might be used as a museum space or as offices for the Princess Grace Foundation. Prince Albert does not have direct ownership of the Prince's Palace, but does possess personal homes in both La Turbie and Marchais.

Albert, a well-known automotive enthusiast, owns vehicles like the BMW Hydrogen 7, the Lexus LS 600h, the Lexus RX 400h, and the Toyota Prius PHV. He also owns a Dassault Aviation Falcon 7X, a 14-passenger leisure jet, currently stationed at Nice Côte d'Azur Airport.

Albert is close friends with the artist Nall and owns some of his works.

On 19 March 2020, amid the COVID-19 pandemic in Europe, it was announced that Albert II had tested positive for COVID-19, making him the first monarch and head of state to have contracted COVID-19. It was reported that he had begun to self-quarantine from within his apartment, performing his work and duties from there. On 31 March, it was announced that he had made a full recovery. In April 2022, he tested positive for COVID-19 for the second time and observed a brief period of self-isolation.

In 2021, Raphaël Domjan became the first pilot of an electric plane flight with a head of state. On September 14, 2021, they took off with a Pipistrel Velis128 operated by Elektropostal from Nice airport in France with Albert II and they flew over Monaco. The plane flew for 30 minutes at a maximum altitude of 900 feet.

Bachelorhood

In October 2005, the German magazine Bunte reported that Albert was dating Telma Ortiz Rocasolano, a sister-in-law of the Prince of Asturias (who is now the King of Spain). However, in November 2005, the Prince instructed his lawyer, Thierry Lacoste, to commence legal proceedings against the French newspaper France Dimanche for violation of privacy and false information regarding the story.

List of claimants with illegitimate children
 Tamara Rotolo — In 1992, an American national filed a paternity suit against the Prince, claiming that he was the father of her daughter, Jazmin Grace. Prince Albert was reportedly listed as the child's father on her  birth certificate, registered in Riverside County, California, United States of America. The case went to trial in 1993 and was eventually dismissed by Superior Court Judge Graham Anderson Cribbs, who refused jurisdiction and found that there was "insufficient connection between [Prince Hereditary] Albert and the State of California to justify hearing a suit [in California]", justifying the statements of the Prince's lawyer. On 31 May 2006, after a DNA test confirmed the child's parentage, Albert admitted, via statement from his lawyer, that he is Jazmin's father. He subsequently provided support and extended an invitation for her to study and live in Monaco.
 Nicole Coste — In May 2005, a former Air France flight attendant from Togo claimed that her youngest son, whom she named Alexandre Coste, was Prince Albert's child, and stated that his parentage had been proven by DNA tests requested by the Monegasque government. She further declared that the Prince had signed a notarised certificate confirming paternity, which she had not received a copy of. The Paris Match published a ten-page interview with Coste, including photographs of Albert holding and feeding the child. Coste also told the publication that she was living in the Prince's Paris apartment, and receiving an allowance from him, while pretending to be the girlfriend of one of his friends in order to maintain discretion. She also stated that the prince had previously last seen the boy in February 2005. The prince's lawyer, Thierry Lacoste, announced that as a result of the international publicity over these revelations, Prince Albert was suing the Daily Mail, Bunte, and Paris Match for privacy violations. On 6 July 2005, a few days before he was enthroned on 12 July, the Prince officially confirmed via his lawyer Lacoste that Alexandre was his biological son.
 Bea Fiedler — In an earlier paternity suit, a German topless model whom  The Daily Telegraph described as a "sex-film star", claimed her son Daniel was the prince's son. A judge reportedly dismissed the suit, despite the fact that Prince Albert had submitted a DNA sample to be tested, as the genetic sample had not been rendered in front of a witness. Fiedler rejected the DNA blood sample as truly belonging to the prince.
 In December 2020, a Brazilian woman filed a paternity suit against Albert, claiming that he had fathered a child with her during his relationship with Charlene. Albert's lawyer described the claim as a 'hoax'.

Marriage

Prince Albert met South African swimmer Charlene Wittstock in 2000 at the Mare Nostrum swimming meet in Monaco. They made their public debut as a couple at the opening ceremony of the 2006 Winter Olympics. She accompanied him to the weddings of the Crown Princess of Sweden in 2010 and of the Duke of Cambridge in 2011.

Their engagement was announced by the palace on June 10, 2010. The wedding was originally scheduled for 8 and 9 July 2011, but was moved forward to prevent a conflict with the International Olympic Committee (IOC) meeting in Durban on 5–9 July, which they both attended. The couple had invited members of the IOC, including president Jacques Rogge, to their wedding.

The couple were married in a civil ceremony on 1 July 2011 in the Throne Room of the Prince's Palace. Wittstock was reported to be in tears during the wedding. The religious ceremony took place in the courtyard of the palace on 2 July, and was presided over by Archbishop Bernard Barsi. The couple honeymooned in Mozambique.

Prince Albert and Princess Charlene had twins, Princess Gabriella, Countess of Carladès, and Jacques, Hereditary Prince of Monaco, on 10 December 2014. Jacques is the heir apparent to the throne.

Charity work and patronages

Albert holds affiliations and patronages within numerous philanthropic organizations. He is the vice-chairman of the Princess Grace Foundation-USA, an American charity founded in 1982, after his mother's death, which supports emerging artists in theatre, dance, and film, as Princess Grace did in her lifetime. Albert holds patronages with AS Monaco., the World Olympians Association, the Monte-Carlo Rolex Masters, the Peace and Sport Organization, and Junior Chamber International. He holds official and honorary presidencies within the Monaco Red Cross, Comité Olympique Monégasque, Association Mondiale des Amis de l'Enfance, The Automobile Club de Monaco, The Festival de Télévision de Monte-Carlo, and Jumping International de Monte Carlo. Albert is affiliated with International Paralympic Committee, Junior Chamber International, and Art of the Olympians. Albert is also a global adviser to Orphans International.

Environmental Interests
In 2001, at the 36th Congress of the Mediterranean Science Commission held in the Principality, the CIESM Member States unanimously elected Monaco in the person of Prince Albert to the presidence of the commission.

The year 2007 was declared as (International) Year of the Dolphin by the United Nations and United Nations Environment Programme.  Prince Albert served as the International Patron of the "Year of the Dolphin", saying "The Year of the Dolphin gives me the opportunity to renew my firm commitment towards protecting marine biodiversity. With this strong initiative we can make a difference to save these fascinating marine mammals from the brink of extinction."

The Zoological Garden of Monaco (Jardin Animalier) was founded by Prince Rainier in 1954. Rainier was petitioned unsuccessfully for many years by Virginia McKenna, founder of the Born Free Foundation, to release a pair of leopards at the zoo. Prince Albert met McKenna after his accession to the throne, and agreed to release the leopards as well the zoo's hippo and camel. He intends to convert the Jardin into a zoo for children.

In January 2009, Prince Albert left for a month-long expedition to Antarctica, where he visited 26 scientific outposts and met with climate-change experts in an attempt to learn more about the impact of global warming on the continent. During the trip, he stopped at the South Pole, making him the only incumbent head of state to have visited both poles.

In June 2009, Prince Albert co-authored an op-ed published in The Wall Street Journal with Charles Clover, the author of The End of the Line, a book about overfishing and ocean conservation issues that had recently been made into a documentary by Rupert Murray. In the piece, Prince Albert and Clover note that bluefin tuna have been severely overfished in the Mediterranean, and decry the common European Union practice of awarding inflated quotas to bluefin fleets. Albert also announced that Monaco would seek to award endangered species status to the Mediterranean bluefin, Thunnus thynnus, (also called the Northern bluefin) under the Convention on International Trade in Endangered Species (CITES). This was the first time a nation had called for the inclusion of Mediterranean bluefin under CITES since Sweden at the 1992 CITES Conference, which was vehemently opposed by Japan who eventually threatened retaliation through trade barriers. Sweden withdrew its proposal.

On 16 July 2009, France declared that it too would seek to have Mediterranean bluefin listed as an endangered species. Only hours later, the United Kingdom followed suit.

On 19 September 2017, Prince Albert expressed his great interest for the preliminary draft of the Global Pact for the Environment presented by French President Emmanuel Macron in the context of the 72nd session of the United Nations General Assembly. He added that he will be very attentive to the future of this Pact, which he qualified as a "universal, legally binding agreement, which recognises the right of future generations to sustainable development."

After having met Torres Strait Islander artist and activist Alick Tipoti in 2016, Prince Albert went to stay with his family on Badu Island, and collaborated with him on the film Alick and Albert (2021), a feature-length documentary film about the future of the oceans, and how climate change affects people in the Torres Strait Islands as well as Monaco. The film had its world premiere at the Brisbane International Film Festival in October 2021.

On 12 February 2020, Albert and Victor Vescovo reached the bottom of Calypso Deep, a depth of 16,762 ft, in a submarine.  They were only the second team to do so after a French group in 1965.

Succession issues
As Rainier III's health declined, his son's lack of legitimate children became a matter of public and political concern owing to the legal and international consequences. Had Prince Albert succeeded his father and died without lawful heirs, it would have triggered Article 3 of the 1918 Franco-Monegasque Treaty, according to which the Principality of Monaco would become a protectorate of the French Republic. Prior to 2002, Monaco's constitution stipulated that only the last reigning prince's "direct and legitimate" descendants could inherit the crown.

On 2 April 2002, Monaco promulgated Princely Law 1.249, which provides that if a reigning prince dies without surviving legitimate issue, the throne passes to his legitimate siblings and their legitimate descendants of both sexes, according to the principle of male-preference primogeniture. Following Albert's accession, this law took full effect in 2005 when ratified by France, pursuant to the Franco-Monégasque Treaty regulating relations between the Principality and its neighbour. Prince Albert's sisters and their legitimate children thereby retained the right to inherit the Monegasque throne, which they would have otherwise lost upon the death of Prince Rainier.

Under the current constitution, neither Jazmin nor Alexandre are in the line of succession to the Monegasque throne as they are not Prince Albert II's legitimate children, and he emphasised their ineligibility to inherit the throne in statements confirming his paternity. Monegasque law stipulates that any non-adulterine illegitimate child is legitimised by the eventual marriage of his/her parents, thereupon obtaining the rights to which that child would have been entitled if born in lawful marriage. Thus Alexandre would have become Monaco's heir apparent under current law if Albert were to marry his son's mother. But in a 2005 exchange with American reporter Larry King, Albert stated that this would not happen.

Prior to the birth of Princess Gabriella and Prince Jacques, Prince Albert's elder sister, Caroline, Princess of Hanover, was heir presumptive and, according to the Grimaldi house law, bore the traditional title of Hereditary Princess of Monaco. Following their birth, she is now third in line.

Titles, styles, honours and arms

Titles and styles 
 14 March 1958 – 16 March 1958: His Serene Highness The Hereditary Prince of Monaco
 16 March 1958 – 6 April 2005: His Serene Highness The Hereditary Prince of Monaco, Marquis of Baux
 31 March 2005 – 6 April 2005: His Serene Highness The Prince Regent of Monaco 
 6 April 2005 – Present: His Serene Highness The Sovereign Prince of Monaco

Military appointments
  Monaco: Colonel of the Compagnie des Carabiniers du Prince (11 November 1986 – 6 April 2005)
  France: Capitaine de frégate de la Marine Nationale (2 April 1992 – present)

Honours

National orders
:
 Grand Master and Grand Cross of the Order of Saint-Charles (Grand Cross, 13 March 1979; Grand Master since 6 April 2005)
 Grand Master of the Order of the Crown (since 6 April 2005)
 Grand Master and Grand Cross of the Order of Grimaldi (Grand Cross, 18 April 1958; Grand Master since 6 April 2005)
 Grand Master of the Order of Cultural Merit (since 6 April 2005)

Foreign orders
 : National Flag Order (16 October 2018)
 : First Class Decoration of the Order of Stara Planina (26 November 2004)
 : Grand Officer of the National Order of Burkina Faso (17 February 2012)
 : Grand Cross with Gold Star of the National Order Juan Mora Fernández (2003)
 : Knight Grand Cross of the Grand Order of King Tomislav (7 April 2009)
 : Grand Collar of the Order of the Liberator of the Slaves José Simeón Cañas (2002)
 :
 Grand Cross of the Order of Legion of Honour (8 November 2005) 
 Grand Cross of the National Order of Merit (25 July 1997)
 Commander of the Order of Academic Palms (19 June 2009)
 Commander of the Order of Maritime Merit (9 December 2015)
 : Grand Cross Special Class of the Order of Merit of the Federal Republic of Germany (9 July 2012)
 : 
 Knight Grand Cross of the Order of the Holy Sepulchre (27 January 1983)
 Knight of Collar of the Order of the Holy Sepulchre (4 October 2021)
 : Knight Grand Cross with Collar of the Order of Merit of the Italian Republic (12 December 2005)
 : Grand Cordon of the Supreme Order of the Renaissance (before 07/2011)
 : Grand Cordon of the Order of Merit (before 07/2011)
 : Grand Cross of the Order of Vytautas the Great (15 October 2012)
 : Grand Cross of the National Order of Mali (12 February 2012)
 : Recipient of the King Willem-Alexander Inauguration Medal
 : Grand Cross of the National Order of Niger (March 1998)
 : Grand Cross of the Order of Vasco Núñez de Balboa (2002)
 : Grand Cross of the Order of the Sun (2003)
 :Member 1st class of the Order of Merit of the Republic of Poland (2012)
 : Grand Collar of the Order of Prince Henry (14 October 2022)
 : Collar of the Order of the Star of Romania (2009)
 :
 Collar of the Order of San Marino (2015)
 Grand Cross of the Order of Saint Agatha (2010)
 :
 Grand Cross of the Order of the Lion (2012)
 Grand Officer of the Order of the Lion (May 1977) 
 : Grand Cross of Order of the Republic of Serbia (7 October 2020) 
 : First Class of the Order of the White Double Cross (2017)
 :
 Bailiff Grand Cross of Honour and Devotion (31 July 2011)
 Collar of the Order pro merito Melitensi (15 October 2009)
 Grand Cross of Honour and Devotion (15 October 1997)
 : Grand Cordon of the Order of 7 November (September 2006)
 :
 Recipient of the 50th Birthday Medal of King Carl XVI Gustaf (30 April 1996)
 Recipient of the 70th Birthday Badge Medal of King Carl XVI Gustaf (30 April 2016)

Dynastic orders
: Grand Cross of the Order of Saints Maurice and Lazarus (1 March 2003)
 House of Petrović-Njegoš: Knight Grand Cross of the Order of Prince Danilo I
 Two Sicilian Royal Family:
 Knight of the Order of Saint Januarius (7 November 2017)
 Bailiff Knight Grand Cross with Collar of Justice of the Sacred Military Constantinian Order of Saint George (7 November 2017)
Other awards
  FIODS: Medal of the International Merit of Blood (12 March 1994)
 : College of Darjah Kerabat Diraja Pahang (7 November 1997)
 : Grand Prix Humanitaire de France (6 March 2007)
  University of Plymouth: Doctor of Science (D.Sc.) (2013)
  Pierre and Marie Curie University: Doctor Honoris Causa (23 March 2017)
  Tel Aviv University: Doctor Honoris Causa (12 June 2018)
  University of Lapland: Doctor Honoris Causa (19 February 2019)
 Zayed International Prize for the Environment (1 February 2014)

In 1996, Prince Albert received the Eagle Award from the United States Sports Academy. The Eagle Award is the academy's highest international honor and was awarded to Prince Albert for his significant contributions in promoting international harmony, peace and goodwill through the effective use of sport.

On 23 October 2009, Prince Albert was awarded the Roger Revelle Prize for his efforts to protect the environment and to promote scientific research. This award was given to Prince Albert by the Scripps Institution of Oceanography in La Jolla, California. Prince Albert is the second recipient of this prize.

In October 2017, Prince Albert received the Lowell Thomas Award from The Explorers Club, a non-profit group that promotes scientific exploration. The award is presented by the president of the club on special occasions to groups of outstanding explorers. The Club cited Prince Albert's dedication to the protection of the environment, commemorating his status as the first head of state to reach both the North and South poles.

On 14 October 2019 at the Comenius University in Bratislava, he received the honorary title "doctor honoris causa" for activities in the field of protection of natural and cultural heritage within his efforts to combat climate change.

Commemorative coins
As Monaco's head of state, Prince Albert II is depicted on both standard-issue and collector's coins, such as the €5 silver Prince Albert II commemorative coin, the first commemorative coin with his effigy, minted in 2008. On the obverse, the prince is depicted in profile with his name on the top of the coin. On the reverse, the Grimaldi coat of arms appears; around it, the words "Principauté de Monaco" (Principality of Monaco) also appear along with the nominal monetary value of the coin.

Arms and emblems

See also
 Legion of Honour
 Legion of Honour Museum 
 List of Legion of Honour recipients by name (A)
 List of foreign recipients of Legion of Honour by name
 List of foreign recipients of the Legion of Honour by country
 List of foreign recipients of the Legion of Honour by decade

References

External links

 Prince Albert II at the official website of the Princely House of Monaco
 Prince Albert II of Monaco Foundation
 Princess Grace Foundation (US website)
 
 
 

|-

|-

|-

|-

1958 births
20th-century Roman Catholics
21st-century Roman Catholics
21st-century Princes of Monaco
21st-century viceregal rulers
Amherst College alumni
Bobsledders at the 1988 Winter Olympics
Bobsledders at the 1992 Winter Olympics
Bobsledders at the 1994 Winter Olympics
Bobsledders at the 1998 Winter Olympics
Bobsledders at the 2002 Winter Olympics
Dakar Rally drivers
Hereditary Princes of Monaco
House of Grimaldi
International Olympic Committee members
Kelly family
Living people
Marquesses of Baux
Members of Leander Club
Monegasque male bobsledders
Monegasque people of American descent
Monegasque people of English descent
Monegasque people of German descent
Monegasque people of Irish descent
Monegasque people of Italian descent
Monegasque people of Mexican descent
Monegasque people of Scottish descent
Monegasque princes
Monegasque rally drivers
Monegasque Roman Catholics
Olympic bobsledders of Monaco
People of Ligurian descent
Princes of Monaco
Regents of Monaco
Royal Olympic participants

Commandeurs of the Ordre des Palmes Académiques
Grand Croix of the Légion d'honneur
Grand Cross of the Ordre national du Mérite
Recipients of the Order of Saint-Charles
Grand Crosses of the Order of Saint-Charles
Grand Masters of the Order of Saint-Charles
Knights Grand Cross of the Order of Grimaldi

Grand Crosses of the Order of the Sun of Peru
Grand Collars of the Order of Prince Henry
Grand Crosses of the National Order of Mali
Grand Crosses of the Order of Vytautas the Great
Knights Grand Cross with Collar of the Order of Merit of the Italian Republic
Knights of the Holy Sepulchre
Recipients of the Order pro Merito Melitensi
Monegasque billionaires
First Class of the Order of the Star of Romania
Dukes of Mayenne
Dukes of Valentinois